Aristidis Kefalogiannis (born 14 March 1960) is a Greek former water polo player who competed in the 1980 Summer Olympics, in the 1984 Summer Olympics, and in the 1988 Summer Olympics.

References

1960 births
Living people
Greek male water polo players
Olympic water polo players of Greece
Panathinaikos Water Polo Club players
Water polo players at the 1980 Summer Olympics
Water polo players at the 1984 Summer Olympics
Water polo players at the 1988 Summer Olympics